Virolainen is a Finnish surname meaning "an Estonian". Notable people with the surname include:

Anne-Mari Virolainen (born 1965), Finnish politician
Daria Virolaynen (born 1989), Russian biathlete
Johannes Virolainen (1914–2000), Finnish politician
Roman Virolaynen, Belarusian cross-country skier

Finnish-language surnames